HD Air Limited (formerly BAC Express Airlines) was a British cargo airline based in Oxfordshire, United Kingdom. It operated contract services for the Royal Mail and other express courier companies, as well as ad hoc freight charters throughout Europe. The main operating bases were Aberdeen Airport, Coventry Airport, Inverness Airport and Luton Airport.

HD Air Limited held a United Kingdom Civil Aviation Authority Type A Operating Licence, permitting it to carry cargo and mail.

History 
The airline was established and started operations in September 1992 as BAC Aircraft. It was formed as part of the BAC Group (established in 1982) and was renamed to BAC Express Airlines in 1995. A majority holding (75%) was acquired by Air Contractors of Ireland on 27 February 2004 and subsequently sold to the 2morrow Group in 2005. In December 2007, the airline was re-branded HD Air to bring it into line with 2morrow Group sister company HD Ferries. In 2009 the Company was sold to Jutlandia Holdings

Fleet
The HD Air fleet consisted of the following aircraft (at Oct 2009):
1 Shorts 360

See also
 List of defunct airlines of the United Kingdom

References

External links

HD Air official website
HD Ferries official website 
2morrow Group website

Defunct airlines of the United Kingdom
Defunct cargo airlines
Airlines established in 1992